Noh Young-Hak (born April 1, 1993) is a South Korean actor.

Filmography

Television series

Films

Awards and nominations

References

External links
 
 
 
 
 

1993 births
Living people
Male actors from Seoul
South Korean male film actors
South Korean male television actors
South Korean male child actors
Place of birth missing (living people)